The Tsivilsk (Tsivilskaya) is a pig breed from Russia.

External links
 http://www.fao.org/docrep/009/ah759e/AH759E10.htm

Pig breeds originating in Russia
Animal breeds originating in the Soviet Union